Hardy's skink (Oligosoma hardyi) is a species of skink, a lizard in the family Scincidae. The species is endemic to the Poor Knights Islands of New Zealand.

Etymology
The specific name, hardyi, is in honor of Kiwi
herpetologist Graham S. Hardy.

Geographic range
In the Poor Knights Islands, O. hardyi occurs on Tawhiti Rahi Island, Aorangi Island, Aorangaia Island, Archway Island, and two rock stacks (Stack “B,” Stack “C”).

Taxonomy
O. hardyi closely resembles the copper skink, Cyclodina aenea, and was considered to be a member of this species until recently when it was described as a new species using morphological, allozyme and DNA methods (Chapple et al. 2008). More recently, the genus Cyclodina was merged with the genus Oligosoma (Chapple et al. 2009), resulting in a new combination for this species, Oligosoma hardyi.

Habitat and behaviour
O. hardyi is most commonly found in areas where there is ground cover near flax and scrub habitat.  It is crepuscular, seeking refuge during the day under stones or thick vegetation.

Description
O. hardyi can be distinguished from all other Oligosoma species, including the other members of the O. aeneum species complex, by having suboculars three and four separated by the fifth supralabial under the eye. In addition, the midbody scale count is greater than that of the slight skink (Oligosoma levidensum) from the Te Paki region.

References

Further reading
Chapple DG, Patterson GB, Bell TP, Daugherty CH (2008). "Taxonomic Revision of the Copper Skink (Cyclodina aenea, Squamata, Scincidea) Species Complex with descriptions of two new species".  Journal of Herpetology 42 (3): 437 – 452. (Cyclodina hardyi, new species).
Chapple DG, Ritchie PA, Daugherty CH (2009). "Origin, diversification, and systematics of the New Zealand skink fauna (Reptilia: Scincidae)". Molecular Phylogenetics and Evolution 52 (2): 470-487. (Oligosoma hardyi, new combination).

Reptiles of New Zealand
Oligosoma
Reptiles described in 2008
Taxa named by David G. Chapple
Taxa named by Geoff B. Patterson
Taxa named by Trent Bell
Taxa named by Charles H. Daugherty